Royal Air Force Westhampnett or more simply RAF Westhampnett is a former Royal Air Force satellite station, located in the village of Westhampnett near Chichester, in the English County of West Sussex.

It was built as an emergency landing airfield for fighter aircraft, as a satellite station to RAF Tangmere. Built on land belonging to the Goodwood Estate, the then landowner, the Duke of Richmond, Frederick Gordon-Lennox retained the Title Deed to the land.

History

Royal Air Force use

Squadrons
 No. 41 Squadron RAF., from RAF Merston 16 December 1941, to RAF Merston 1 April 1942; operating Supermarine Spitfire Vb
 No. 43 Squadron RAF.
 No. 65 Squadron RAF.
 No. 91 Squadron RAF.
 No. 118 Squadron RAF.
 No. 124 Squadron RAF.
 No. 129 Squadron RAF.
 No. 130 Squadron RAF.
 No. 131 Squadron RAF.
 No. 145 Squadron RAF - operating Hawker Hurricane.
 No. 167 Squadron RAF.
 No. 174 Squadron RAF.
 No. 175 Squadron RAF.
 No. 184 Squadron RAF.
 No. 245 Squadron RAF.
 No. 302 Polish Fighter Squadron.
 No. 303 Polish Fighter Squadron.
 No. 340 Squadron RAF.
 No. 350 (Belgian) Squadron.
 No. 402 Squadron RCAF.
 No. 416 Squadron RCAF.
 No. 441 Squadron RCAF.
 No. 442 Squadron RCAF.
 No. 443 Squadron RCAF.
 No. 485 (NZ) Squadron RAF.
 No. 501 Squadron RAF.
 No. 602 Squadron RAF - operating Supermarine Spitfire.
 No. 610 Squadron RAF - operating Supermarine Spitfire.
 No. 614 Squadron RAF.
 No. 616 Squadron RAF.
 787 Naval Air Squadron.

Units
 No. 83 Group Support Unit (1944-45)
 No. 121 Airfield RAF
 No. 144 (RCAF) Airfield RAF
 No. 402 Air Stores Park
 No. 1493 (Fighter) Gunnery Flight
 Air Sea Rescue Flight RAF, Merston/Westhampnett (1941)

United States Army Air Forces
 31st Fighter Group between 1 August 1942 and 8 November 1942.

Current use
Upon its closure by the RAF, Westhampnett airfield subsequently became the Goodwood Motor Racing Circuit and Chichester/Goodwood Airport.

See also
 List of former Royal Air Force stations
 List of Royal Air Force aircraft squadrons
 Goodwood Circuit

References

Citations

Bibliography

External links

Royal Air Force - Battle of Britain 11 Group page
Gallery of images of RAF Westhampnett
The Wartime Memories Project - RAF Westhampnett

Military units and formations established in 1940
Royal Air Force stations in West Sussex
Military units and formations disestablished in 1946
Royal Air Force stations of World War II in the United Kingdom